Archduchess Maria Amalia of Austria (Maria Amalia Josephe Johanna Katharina Theresia; 15 October 1780 - 25 December 1798) was an Archduchess of Austria by birth.

Biography

Maria Amalia was a daughter of Emperor Leopold II (1747–1792) and his wife Maria Luisa of Spain (1745–1792). Maria Amalia was born in Florence, the then-capital of Tuscany, where her father reigned as Grand Duke from 1765 to 1790. Her father was a son of Empress Maria Theresa and her mother a daughter of Charles III of Spain. Her godparents were her mother's first cousin, Ferdinand, Duke of Parma, and his wife, Maria Amalia, her father's sister.

She had a happy childhood surrounded by her many siblings. As her siblings, Maria Amalia was given a somewhat different upbringing than was usual for royal children at the time: they were actually raised by their parents rather than a retinue of servants, were largely kept apart from any ceremonial court life and were taught to live simply, naturally and modestly. In 1790, her father became emperor and the family moved to Vienna. She died unmarried at the age of only 18 years in Vienna.

Ancestors

References 

Austrian princesses
1780 births
1798 deaths
Daughters of emperors
Burials at the Imperial Crypt
Burials at St. Stephen's Cathedral, Vienna
Children of Leopold II, Holy Roman Emperor
Daughters of kings